Hastein (Old Norse: Hásteinn, also recorded as Hastingus, Anstign, Haesten, Hæsten, Hæstenn or Hæsting and alias Alsting) was a notable Viking chieftain of the late 9th century who made several raiding voyages.

Early life 
Little is known of Hastein's early life. He is described as a Dane in the Anglo-Saxon Chronicle.

Hastein is credited with being involved with various raids on the Frankish Empire. He also led a great raid into the Mediterranean in 859.
For indeed the Frankish nation, which was crushed by the avenger Anstign [Hastein], was very full of filthy uncleanness. Treasonous and oath-breaking, they were deservedly condemned; unbelievers and faithless, they were justly punished ... Dudo of St. Quentin's. Gesta Normannorum. Book 1. Chapter 3.

Spain and the Mediterranean 
During 859–862, Hastein jointly led an expedition with Björn Ironside. A fleet of 62 ships sailed from the Loire to raid countries in the Mediterranean.

At first the raiding did not go well, with Hastein being defeated by the Asturians and later the Muslims of the Umayyad emirate of Córdoba at Niebla in 859. Success followed with the sacking of Algeciras, where the mosque was burned, and then the ravaging of Mazimma in the Idrisid Caliphate on the north coast of Africa, followed by further raids into the Umayyad Caliphate at Orihuela, the Balearic Islands and Roussillon. They occupied Nekor for 8 days.

Hastein and Björn  wintered at Camargue island on the mouth of the Rhone before ravaging Narbonne, Nîmes and Arles, then as far north as Valence, before moving onto Italy. There they attacked the city of Luna. Believing it to be Rome, Hastein had his men carry him to the gate and tell the guards he was dying and wished to convert to Christianity. Once inside, he was taken to the town's church where he received the sacraments, before jumping from his stretcher and leading his men in a sack of the town. Another account has him claiming to want to convert before he died, and then feigning death on the following day. Luna then allowed his body and 50 of his men clad in robes enter for his burial. Hastein's men had concealed swords under their robes, and once inside Hastein leaped from his coffin, decapitated the priest and sacked the city. However, the veracity of this is much debated. He sailed down the coast and sacked Pisa and, sailing on the River Arno, ravaged Fiesole. The fleet then possibly raided the Byzantine Empire's territories in the eastern Mediterranean.

On the way back to the Loire, he stopped off in North Africa where he bought several African slaves (known to the Vikings as 'blámenn', blue men, possibly Soussians or Tuaregs) whom he later sold in Ireland. They were presumed to have lost 40 ships in a storm, and lost 2 more at the Straits of Gibraltar on their way home, near Medina-Sidonia, but still managed to ravage Pamplona before returning home to the Loire with 20 ships.

Loire and Seine 

Settled back in Brittany, Hastein allied himself with Salomon, King of Brittany against the Franks in 866, and as part of a Viking-Breton army he killed Robert the Strong at the Battle of Brissarthe near Châteauneuf-sur-Sarthe. In 867 he went on to ravage Bourges and a year later attacked Orléans. Peace lasted until spring 872 when the Viking fleet sailed up the Maine and occupied Angers, which led to a siege by the Frankish king Charles the Bald and a peace being agreed in October 873.

Hastein remained in the Loire country until 882, when he was finally expelled by Charles and then relocated his army north to the Seine. There he stayed until the Franks besieged Paris and his territory in the Picardy was threatened. It was at this point he became one of many experienced Vikings to look to England for riches and plunder.

England 
Hastein crossed to England from Boulogne in 892 leading one of two great companies. His army, the smaller of the two, landed in 80 ships and occupied the royal village of Milton Regis near Sittingbourne in Kent, whilst his allies landed at Appledore with 250 ships. Alfred the Great positioned the West Saxon army between them to keep them from uniting, the result of which was that Hastein agreed terms, including allowing his two sons to be baptised, and left Kent for Essex. The larger army attempted to reunite with Hastein after raiding Hampshire and Berkshire in the late spring of 893, but was defeated at Farnham by an army under Edward, Alfred's son. The survivors eventually reached Hastein's army at Mersea Island, after a combined West Saxon and Mercian army failed to dislodge them from their fortress at Thorney.

As a result, Hastein combined his forces from Appledore and Milton and withdrew them to a fortified camp at Benfleet, Essex.  He used this camp as a base to raid Mercia. However, while his main force was out raiding those left in the fort were defeated by the bolstered militia of eastern Wessex. The West Saxons captured the fort, along with the ships, booty, women and children. This included Hastein's own wife and sons. Hastein re-established his combined force at a new fort at Shoebury further east in Essex, and received reinforcements from the settled Danes of  East Anglia and York. Shortly after, according to the Anglo-Saxon Chronicle, Hastein held talks with Alfred, possibly to discuss terms for the release of his family.
Whatever the discussion, it seems Hastein had his two sons returned to him. The Anglo-Saxon Chronicle tells us that it was because
Alfred and Alfred's son-in-law Aethelred of Mercia, had stood sponsor to Hastein's sons at their baptism in early 893, before Hastein had arrived at Benfleet. Thus Alfred was godfather to one boy and Aethelred godfather to the other

If Alfred's strategy was to create peace then it was a failure as shortly after, Hastein launched a second raid along the Thames valley and from there along the River Severn. Hastein was pursued all the way by Aethelred and a combined Mercian and West Saxon army, reinforced by a contingent of warriors from the Welsh kingdoms. Eventually the Viking army was trapped at Buttington—this was possibly the island of Buttington on the  Severn near Welshpool, Powys—then at the resulting  Battle of Buttington several weeks later they fought their way out, and lost many men, and returned to the fortress at Shoebury. According to the annals:
..after many weeks had passed, some of the heathen [Vikings] died of hunger, but some, having by then eaten their horses, broke out of the fortress, and joined battle with those who were on the east bank of the river. But, when many thousands of pagans had been slain, and all the others had been put to flight, the Christians [English] were masters of the place of death. In that battle the most noble Ordheah and many of the king's thegns were killed ...

In late summer 893, Hastein's men struck out again. They moved all their booty, women and ships, from East Anglia, to the ruined Roman fortress at Chester. The plan was to rebuild the fortifications and use it as a base for raiding northern Mercia. However, the Mercians had other ideas, they laid siege to the fortress and attempted to starve the Danes out by removing or retrieving any livestock and destroying any crops in the area.

In the autumn the besieged army left Chester, marched down to the south of Wales and devastated the Welsh kingdoms of Brycheiniog, Gwent and Glywysing until the summer of 894. They came back via Northumbria, the Danish-held midlands of the Five Burghs, and East Anglia to return to the fort at Mersea Island. In the autumn of 894, the army towed their ships up the Thames to a new fort on the River Lea. In the summer of 895 Alfred arrived with the West Saxon army, and obstructed the course of the Lea with a fort either side of the river. The Danes abandoned their camp, returned their women to East Anglia and made another great march across the Midlands to a site on the Severn (where Bridgnorth now stands), followed all the way by hostile forces. There they stayed until the spring of 896 when the army finally dispersed into East Anglia, Northumbria and according to the Anglo-Saxon Chronicle, those that were penniless found themselves ships and went south across the sea to the Seine.

Legacy 

Hastein disappeared from history in around 896, by then an old man having already been described as "the lusty and terrifying old warrior of the Loire and the Somme", when he arrived in England several years earlier. He was one of the most notorious and successful Vikings of all time, having raided dozens of cities across many kingdoms in Europe and North Africa.

The Picard monk Dudo of Saint-Quentin was very critical of Hastein:
This was a man accursed: fierce, mightily cruel, and savage, pestilent, hostile, sombre, truculent, given to outrage, pestilent and untrustworthy, insolent, fickle and lawless. Death-dealing, uncouth, fertile in ruses, warmonger-general, traitor, fomenter of evil, and double-dyed dissimulator ... Dudo of St. Quentin's. Gesta Normannorum. Book 1. Chapter 3.

He is identified with the Jarl Hasting who held the Channel Islands for a while.

Some scholars have suggested that the Hastings area of Sussex in England may have been founded by a forebear of Hastein.

Fictional representations 
Jarl Hastein is a recurring character in Bernard Cornwell's The Saxon Stories novels, as a former ally and then opponent of Uhtred of Bebbanburg. In the television adaptation The Last Kingdom  he is played by Norwegian actor Jeppe Beck Laursen.

The character of Halfdan the Black in Vikings, portrayed by Finnish actor Jasper Pääkkönen, is a composite of Hastein and the historical Halfdan the Black.

Jarl Hastein is the main protagonist in C.J. Adrien's popular trilogy of novels titled The Saga of Hasting the Avenger, about Hastein's supposed early life (using the French spelling of the name, 'Hasting').

Jarl Hastein appears in the popular "Crusader Kings" video game series, first appearing in Crusader Kings II The Old Gods DLC "Viking Age" era and again in Crusader Kings III as a highlighted character to play during "The Great Adventurers" start.

Jarl Hastein also appears in the fictional series The Strongbow Saga written by Judson Roberts.

References

Further reading 

 The Vikings by Magnus Magnusson, (December 1, 2003) Tempus Publishing Ltd 
 History of the Bailiwick of Guernsey by James Marr (July 16, 1982) Phillimore & Co Ltd

External links 
 Cindy Vallar's Viking Page
 Vikings in the Channel Islands

Viking Age in France
Viking Age in Italy
Viking Age in Spain
Viking warriors
9th-century Danish people
9th-century Vikings